The IIFA Award for Best Supporting Actress is chosen by the viewers and the winner is announced at the ceremony.

The award is given in the current year but the actress who wins it is awarded for the previous year.

Superlatives

 Only five actresses have won both Best Supporting Actress and Best Actress award; In chronological order they are: Rani Mukerji, Kangana Ranaut, Anushka Sharma, Tabu and Priyanka Chopra.
 Parineeti Chopra and Priyanka Chopra are the only cousins who have won the award.

List of winners
† - indicates the performance also won the Filmfare Award for Best Supporting Actress‡ - indicates the performance was also nominated for the Filmfare Award for Best Supporting Actress

2000s
 2000 Sushmita Sen – Biwi No.1 as Rupali †
 Aruna Irani – Haseena Maan Jaayegi as Santho Verma
 Reema Lagoo – Vaastav: The Reality as Shanta ‡
 Sushmita Sen – Sirf Tum as Neha Kumari ‡
 Tabu – Biwi No.1 as Lovely
 2001 Jaya Bachchan – Fiza as Nishatbi Ikramullah †
 Mahima Chaudhry – Dhadkan as Sheetal Varma ‡ 
 Namrata Shirodkar – Pukar as Pooja Mallapa
 Sonali Bendre – Hamara Dil Aapke Paas Hai as Khushi Malhotra
 Sonali Kulkarni – Mission Kashmir as Neelama Khan ‡
 2002 Jaya Bachchan – Kabhi Khushi Kabhie Gham... as Nandini Raichand †
 Bipasha Basu – Ajnabee as Neeta (Fake Sonia)
 Kareena Kapoor – Kabhi Khushi Kabhie Gham... as Pooja Sharma a.k.a. Poo ‡
 Madhuri Dixit – Lajja as Janki ‡
 Rekha – Lajja as Ramdulaari ‡
 2003 Kirron Kher – Devdas as Sumitra Chakraborty ‡ 
 Kareena Kapoor – Mujhse Dosti Karoge! as Tina
 2004 Jaya Bachchan – Kal Ho Naa Ho as Jennifer Kapur †
 Juhi Chawla – Jhankaar Beats as Shanti
 Maya Alagh – LOC Kargil as Manoj Pandey's mother
 Rekha – Koi... Mil Gaya as Sonia Mehra ‡
 Shoma Anand – Hungama as Anjali Tiwari
 2005 Rani Mukerji – Veer-Zaara as Saamiya Siddiqui ‡
 Divya Dutta – Veer-Zaara as Shabbo ‡ 
 Esha Deol – Dhoom as Sheena
 Kishori Ballal – Swades as Kaveri Amma
 Rani Mukerji – Yuva as Shashi Biswas †
 2006 Ayesha Kapur – Black as Young Michelle McNally †
 Juhi Chawla – My Brother…Nikhil as Anamika
 Lara Dutta – No Entry as Kaajal (Kishan's wife)
 Shernaz Patel – Black as Akram Sheikh
 Shweta Prasad – Iqbal as Khadija ‡
 2007 Soha Ali Khan – Rang De Basanti as Sonia/Durgawati Devi ‡ 
 Kirron Kher – Kabhi Alvida Naa Kehna as Kamaljit 'Kamal' Saran ‡
 Kirron Kher – Rang De Basanti as Mitro ‡
 Konkona Sen Sharma – Omkara as Indu †
 Preity Zinta – Kabhi Alvida Naa Kehna as Rhea Saran ‡
 Rekha – Krrish as Sonia Mehra ‡
 2008 Konkona Sen Sharma – Life in a... Metro as Shruti † 
Chitrashi Rawat – Chak De! India as Komal Chautala
 Konkona Sen Sharma – Laaga Chunari Mein Daag as Shubhavari Sahay / Chutki
Rani Mukerji – Saawariya as Gulabji ‡
Vidya Balan – Guru as Meenakshi "Meenu" Saxena
Zohra Sehgal – Cheeni Kum as Buddhadev's mother
 2009 Kangana Ranaut – Fashion as Shonali Gujral †
 Bipasha Basu – Bachna Ae Haseeno as Radhika/Shreya Rathore ‡
 Ila Arun – Jodhaa Akbar as Maham Anga
 Kirron Kher – Dostana as Sameer's mother ‡
 Shahana Goswami – Rock On!! as Debbie ‡

2010s

 2010 Divya Dutta – Delhi-6 as Jalebi ‡
 Arundhati Nag – Paa as Vidya's mother ‡
 Kalki Koechlin – Dev.D as Leni/Chandramukhi (Chanda) †
 Kirron Kher – Kurbaan as Aapa
 Supriya Pathak – Wake Up Sid as Sarita ‡
 2011 Prachi Desai – Once Upon A Time In Mumbaai as Mumtaz ‡
 Amrita Puri – Aisha as Shefali Thakur ‡
 Dimple Kapadia – Dabangg as Naini Devi
 Ratna Pathak – Golmaal 3 as Geeta ‡
 Shernaz Patel – Guzaarish as Devyani Dutta
 2012 Parineeti Chopra – Ladies vs Ricky Bahl as Dimple Chaddha ‡
 Divya Dutta – Stanley Ka Dabba as Ms. Rosy
 Kalki Koechlin – Zindagi Na Milegi Dobara as Natasha ‡
 Sonali Kulkarni – Singham as Megha Kadam
 Swara Bhaskar – Tanu Weds Manu as Payal ‡
 2013 Anushka Sharma – Jab Tak Hai Jaan as Akira Rai †
 Diana Penty – Cocktail as Meera Sahni
 Divya Dutta – Heroine as Pallavi Narayan
 Dolly Ahluwalia – Vicky Donor as Mrs. Arora
 Jacqueline Fernandez – Housefull 2 as Bobby
 Reema Sen – Gangs of Wasseypur – Part 1 as Durga
 2014 Divya Dutta – Bhaag Milkha Bhaag as Ishri Kaur ‡ 
 Kalki Koechlin – Yeh Jawaani Hai Deewani as Aditi Mehra ‡
 Kangana Ranaut – Krrish 3 as Kaya
 Richa Chadda – Goliyon Ki Raasleela Ram-Leela as Rasila 
 Shruti Haasan – D-Day as Suraiya
 Swara Bhaskar – Raanjhanaa as Bindiya ‡
 2015 Tabu – Haider as Ghazala Meer †
 Amrita Singh – 2 States as Kavita Malhotra ‡
 Huma Qureshi – Dedh Ishqiya as Muniya
 Juhi Chawla – Gulaab Gang as Sumitra Devi ‡
 Lisa Haydon – Queen as Vijayalakshmi ‡
 2016 Priyanka Chopra – Bajirao Mastani as Kashibai †
 Huma Qureshi – Badlapur as Jhimli ‡
 Konkona Sen Sharma – Talvar as Nutan Tandon
 Tanvi Azmi – Bajirao Mastani as Radhabai ‡
 2017 Shabana Azmi - Neerja as Rama Bhanot †
 Andrea Tariang -  Pink as Andrea Tariang
 Disha Patani - M.S. Dhoni: The Untold Story as Priyanka Jha
 Ratna Pathak Shah - Kapoor & Sons as Sunita Kapoor ‡
 Richa Chadda - Sarbjit as Sukhpreet Kaur ‡
 Kirti Kulhari -  Pink as Falak Ali
 2018 Meher Vij - Secret Superstar as Najma Malik †
Neha Dhupia - Tumhari Sulu as Maryam "Maria" Sood
Seema Pahwa - Bareilly Ki Barfi as Susheela Mishra ‡
Seema Pahwa - Shubh Mangal Saavdhan as Sugandha's mother ‡
Tabu - Golmaal Again as Anna Matthew
2019 Aditi Rao Hydari - Padmaavat as Mehrunissa
Neena Gupta - Mulk as Tabassum Mohammed
Radhika Apte - Andhadhun as Sophie
Swara Bhaskar - Veere Di Wedding as Sakshi Soni ‡
Surekha Sikri - Badhaai Ho as Durga Kaushik †

2020s
2020 Kiara Advani - Good Newwz as Monica Batra 
Amrita Singh - Badla as Rani Kaur ‡
Yami Gautam - Bala as Pari Mishra
Sayani Gupta - Article 15 as Gaura
Amruta Subhash - Gully Boy as Razia Ahmed †
Sai Tamhankar – Mimi as Shama
 Gauhar Khan – 14 Phere as Zubina
 Lara Dutta – Bell Bottom as Indira Gandhi
 Radhika Madan – Angrezi Medium as Taarika "Taaru" Bansal
 Shalini Vatsa – Ludo as Lata Kutty

See also 
 IIFA Awards
 Bollywood
 Cinema of India

References

External links 
Official site

International Indian Film Academy Awards
Film awards for supporting actress